The 1956 Boston Red Sox season was the 56th season in the franchise's Major League Baseball history. The Red Sox finished fourth in the American League (AL) with a record of 84 wins and 70 losses, 13 games behind the New York Yankees, who went on to win the 1956 World Series.

Offseason 
 November 8, 1955: Karl Olson, Dick Brodowski, Tex Clevenger, Neil Chrisley, and Al Curtis (minors) were traded by the Red Sox to the Washington Senators for Mickey Vernon, Bob Porterfield, Johnny Schmitz, and Tom Umphlett.
 November 27, 1955: Ed Mayer was drafted from the Red Sox by the St. Louis Cardinals in the 1955 minor league draft.

Regular season

Season standings

Record vs. opponents

Opening Day lineup

Roster

Player stats

Batting

Starters by position 
Note: Pos = Position; G = Games played; AB = At bats; H = Hits; Avg. = Batting average; HR = Home runs; RBI = Runs batted in

Other batters 
Note: G = Games played; AB = At bats; H = Hits; Avg. = Batting average; HR = Home runs; RBI = Runs batted in

Pitching

Starting pitchers 
Note: G = Games pitched; IP = Innings pitched; W = Wins; L = Losses; ERA = Earned run average; SO = Strikeouts

Other pitchers 
Note: G = Games pitched; IP = Innings pitched; W = Wins; L = Losses; ERA = Earned run average; SO = Strikeouts

Relief pitchers 
Note: G = Games pitched; W = Wins; L = Losses; SV = Saves; ERA = Earned run average; SO = Strikeouts

Farm system 

Source:

References

External links
1956 Boston Red Sox team at Baseball-Reference
1956 Boston Red Sox season at baseball-almanac.com

Boston Red Sox seasons
Boston Red Sox
Boston Red Sox
1950s in Boston